"Never Enough" is a song by American heavy metal band Five Finger Death Punch. It was included as a bonus track on the re-release of their debut album, The Way of the Fist. It was also made available on the band's website to anyone who had purchased the a copy of the original release of the album. It was released as the second single from The Way of the Fist on July 15, 2008. The song peaked at number nine on the Billboard Mainstream Rock Tracks chart.

Music video
A video was directed by Agata Alexander.

The video begins showing a black-haired woman with a heavily tattooed man in what seems to be some sort of bondage fetish. The man then leaves in a white car and kisses the woman goodbye. The car is shown stopped somewhere, and a young man gets into the car revealing a handgun. A black Mercedes is shown, and the driver buys drugs from an unknown person (seemingly heroin, as the Mercedes driver is seen torching a spoon with a lighter). The white car is shown pulling up to a gas station, and the two men don ski masks and rob the store. A police car approaches the black Mercedes with its lights on, and the man gets nervous until the cop car quickly drives past him. The man then drives to the gas station held up by the other two men earlier, and the police car that passed the Mercedes is already there. The man approaches the crime scene/caution tape and is stopped by the police, but the man reveals his own badge. A chalk outline is shown on the ground outside the store, but it is not shown who was killed. The woman with the black hair from the beginning of the video is shown looking into a mirror and removing a wig, revealing her natural blonde hair. The young man who brought the gun to the robbery is shown looking depressed on his bed, holding said gun. The man with the badge from the Mercedes puts his badge in a desk drawer and is shown also looking bothered/depressed, and has a picture of the young gunman (his son) on his desk. The video ends showing all three of the characters (woman, young man and cop) eating dinner together; the adulterous wife, the murdering son and the druggie cop are all family, and all seem to wear a facade of everything being normal and ok. The video ends with a family picture being burned.

Track listing

Personnel
Ivan Moody – vocals
Darrell Roberts – guitars, backing vocals
Zoltan Bathory – guitars 
Matt Snell – bass, backing vocals
Jeremy Spencer – drums

2008 singles
2007 songs
Five Finger Death Punch songs
Songs written by Zoltan Bathory
Songs written by Ivan Moody (vocalist)
Songs written by Leopold Ross